Ferdinand Julian Egeberg (23 November 1842 – 12 September 1921) was a Norwegian military officer, chamberlain and timber merchant. He is remembered for having founded the sports prize Egebergs Ærespris, which was regarded as the highest achievement in Norwegian sport.

Personal life
Egeberg was born in Moss  in Østfold, Norway. He was the son of merchant Peder Cappelen Egeberg and Hanna Wilhelmine Scheel. He was a brother of Einar Westye Egeberg, Sr. and a grandson of Westye Egeberg.

He married Lucy Parr in 1876. Their son Westye Parr Egeberg was a notable landowner. Through their daughter Esther Lucy Egeberg he was grandfather of painter and writer Ferdinand Finne. He died in Tolga in 1921, aged 78.

Career
Egeberg was a naval officer from 1863, and served in the British Royal Navy from 1865. He was first lieutenant à la suite from 1874, and discharged in 1875. Together with his brother Einar, he took over his family's Christiania-based timber company Westye Egeberg & Co in 1874, after the death of their father. He was an associate from 1879. He served as Cabinet Chamberlain for Oscar II of Sweden from 1887 to 1905.

Egeberg was decorated as a Knight, First Class of the Royal Norwegian Order of St. Olav in 1891. He was a Commander, First Class of the Danish Order of the Dannebrog, Knight Grand Officer of the Order of the Crown of Italy, Officer of the French Légion d'honneur, Commander of the Spanish Order of Charles III, Knight Grand Officer of the Spanish Order of Isabella the Catholic and the Swedish Order of the Polar Star, and recipient of 
King Oscar II's Anniversary Medal.

Egebergs Ærespris
Upon his 75th birthday in 1917, Egeberg donated  to the sports association Norges Riksforbund for Idræt. The donation was basis for the sports prize Kabinetskammerherre Egebergs ærespris for alsidig idrett. According to the original statutes approved in 1920, the fund's interests should be used for a statuette given to a sportsperson who, during the last two years, had excelled in one sport and also showed eminent performances in another, completely different sport. Egeberg also funded a design competition for the trophy, won by sculptor Magnus Vigrestad. The statuette became regarded as the highest achievement in Norwegian sport at the time. The first prize was awarded for 1918.

The statutes have changed slightly over the years. Today the prize is awarded by the Norwegian Olympic and Paralympic Committee and Confederation of Sports, and given to Norwegian sports people who have excelled nationally in at least two sports, and excelled internationally in at least one of these.

References

External links
Egebergs Ærespris website (Norges idrettsforbund og olympiske og paralympiske komité)

1842 births
1921 deaths
People from Moss, Norway
Royal Norwegian Navy personnel
Royal Navy officers
Norwegian businesspeople
Officiers of the Légion d'honneur
Recipients of the Order of Isabella the Catholic
Commanders by Number of the Order of Isabella the Catholic
Commanders First Class of the Order of the Polar Star